Jatin Sarker (born 25 August 1935) is a Bengali intellectual, researcher and biographer of Bangladesh. He was awarded the Bangla Academy Literary Award in 2008 for research and essays and Independence Day Award in 2010 for education. As of September 2021, he has published 35 books.

Early life
Sarker was born on 25 August 1935 in Chandapara village, Kendua Upazila of Netrokona of the-then Mymensingh district in British India. He was the eldest of three children, two brothers and a sister. He married in 1965 and with his wife Kanon Sarker has one son, namely, Suman Sarker (he lives in Slovakia) and a daughter, namely, Sudipta Sarkar (she lives in Bangladesh). 

He is a member of Transparency International Bangladesh (TIB)'s Committees of Concerned Citizens of Bangladesh.

Career
Sarker took the profession of teaching after graduation by joining the Ashulia College in Netrikona in 1957. Later he joined the Nasirabad College in 1964 where he taught Bengali literature at the pre-university and undergraduate levels until his retirement in 2002. 

Since the late 1960s, Sarker has remained involved in the cultural activities of Mymensingh. He has been a member of Mymensingh Press Club since long. In 2007, he started a magazine titled Shomaj, Orthonithir O Rastro (tr. The Society, Economy and State).

Sarker served as the president of Udichi Central Sangsad of Bangladesh Udichi Shilpigoshthi.

Sarker's latest book "Prottoy Protigya Protibha" was published in February 2019.

Political philosophy
Sarker has always spoken for upholding and ensuring human rights and for resisting social oppression, discrimination and communal politics. On 29 April 2006, he presided over a regional dialogue on national election policy and the initiative of the civil society in Mymensingh. As chair of a meeting organised in Mymensingh in observance of the World Press Freedom Day in 2006, he said that now everything is captured by money and, consequently, it is so difficult to ensure freedom of press since the press is owned and controlled by the corporations and business magnets who act in favour of capitalism and serve as an agent of capitalist imperialism and globalisation. There is certainly a strong relationship among media and development and poverty alleviation but poverty will never be reduced until corruption, injustice, inequality etc. eliminated from the society. He urged all to achieve
freedom and establish one's right through continuous struggle." He believes that religion-based politics should be banned in line with the constitution of Bangladesh of 1972. He also maintained that the Members of the Parliaments should not be involved in activities other than legislating.

Sarker was arrested on 3 March 1976 and detained for 18 months.

Awards
 "Doctor Muhammad Enamul Haque Gold Medal" by Bangla Academy
 "Prothom Alo Best Book of the Year 1411" for his book titled Pakistaner Janmo Mrityu-Darshan (2006)
 Bangla Academy Literary Award (2008)
 Narayanganj Shruti Gold Medal
 Mymensingh Press Club Literary Award
 Khaleq Dad Chowdhury Literary Award 
 Moniruddin Yusuf Literary Award.

Documentary
Noted film-maker Tanvir Mokammel produced a documentary 1971 with a section on Sarker. It was released in March 2006.

Publications
So far Sarker has published 17 titles to his credit. One of his important publication is Pakistaner Janmo Mrityu-Darshan, published in 2005. Another important book is  Bangladesher Kavigan published by Bangla Academy in 1985. Some other books are Sahittyar Kachey Pratyasha, Bangalee Somajtantrik Otihya, Sankritir Sangram, Manab Mon, Manab Dharma and Shomaj Biplab, Aamaader Chintacharchar Dig-diganta , Sirajuddin Kashimpuri , Haricharan Acharjya , Golpe Golpe Bakyaran and Dijatitatwa Niotibad O BijnanChetona ,

Personal life
Sarker has been living in Netrokona since 2005.

References

Further reading
 Lekhok Obidhan, Bangla Academy, 1999, Dhaka.
 Ditiyo Chinta- Jatin Sarker issue, 2007, Mymensingh, edited by Iffat Ara.

External links
 Stretnutie s bangladéšskym spisovateľom Jatinom Sarkerom by Martin Krno

Living people
1935 births
People from Netrokona District
Bengali-language writers
Bangladeshi scholars
Recipients of Bangla Academy Award
Recipients of the Independence Day Award
Communist Party of Bangladesh politicians